Layo & Bushwacka! is the pseudonym of British DJ duo Layo Paskin and Matthew Benjamin, who released four tech house albums between 1998 and 2012.

Layo Paskin
Paskin, from London, began his DJ career at the age of sixteen while working at Camden Market. Not long after, he began DJing at warehouse parties with Mr. C. In the course of his work, Paskin's father discovered the building that would become The End, a 19th-century stable for mail horses.

Along with Mr. C, Paskin was the co-owner of The End nightclub in London. Labelled variously as tech house, house or breakbeat, the pair usually record and DJ together. Paskin's father is an architect and designed the club.

Paskin, along with his sister Zoë Paskin, is now a restaurateur with several hospitality businesses in central London. The pair's first site, The Palomar, opened in 2014, serving Jerusalem-inspired cuisine. The restaurant was voted OFM Restaurant of the Year in 2015. This was followed in 2016 by The Barbary, an open kitchen bar serving food from the Barbary Coast of north Africa. In 2017, Paskin and his sister opened a coffee house named Jacob the Angel, and renovated the Blue Posts pub on Rupert Street, converting the top floor into a cocktail bar named The Mulwray, and the basement into a small counter dining restaurant called Evelyn's Table.

Matthew Benjamin
Benjamin's best known track is his remix of Michael Jackson's "Billie Jean". He was raised in London and was a member of the London School Symphony Orchestra, playing percussion. After graduating in sound engineering he started working for Mr. C as he was setting up The End;  Benjamin was the resident DJ there. It was at this point that he first met Paskin.

Discography

Albums
1998: Low Life (End Recordings)
2002: Night Works (XL Recordings)
2003: All Night Long (End Recordings)
2006: Feels Closer (Olmeto Records)
2007: Global Underground 033: Rio (Global Underground Ltd.)
2012: Rising & Falling (Olmeto Records)

Singles

1999: "Deep South" (End Recordings)
1999: "Ear Candy" (End Recordings)
2002: "Love Story (vs. Finally)" (XL Recordings) (Billboard Hot Dance Club Play #4)
2003: "Love Story vs. Finally" (XL Recordings) (UK Singles Chart #8)
2003: "It's Up to You (Shining Through)" (UK #25) (XL Recordings)
2003: "Deep South" 
2006: "Feels Closer" (Olmeto Records)
2006: "Life2Live" (Olmeto Records)
2008: "Things Change" (Olmeto Records)

Remixes
2001: Orbital – "Funny Break (One Is Enough) [Layo & Bushwacka! Mix]"
2001: Reprazent – "Lucky Pressure"
2001: Stanton Warriors – "The Phantom"
2002: Jakatta – "My Vision [Layo & Bushwacka! Vocal Mix]"
2002: Bebel Gilberto – "So Nice [Layo & Bushwacka! Mix]"
2002: Paul Oakenfold – "Ready Steady Go [Layo & Bushwacka! Remix]"
2003: Finley Quaye & William Orbit – "Dice [Layo & Bushwacka! Missing You Mix]"
2003: Ella Fitzgerald – "Angel Eyes [Layo & Bushwacka! Mix]"
2003: Depeche Mode – "Dream On [Bushwacka! Mix]"

References

External links

 Bushwacka (Just Be) interview @ Mute/Control (Spanish)

Club DJs
English house music duos
English techno music groups
Musical groups from London
English DJs
Electronic dance music DJs